Zacron, born Richard Drew (1943 - January 2012) was an English artist who designed the Led Zeppelin III album cover. 
  
Zacron was born in Sutton, Surrey in 1943. He studied painting, drawing, design and etching at Studio 35 in Surbiton from 1957-1960 with Eric Clapton, and later at Kingston College of Art where he met Jimmy Page. He lectured at Leeds College of Art from 1967-1970. He also taught at Acton County School.

Zacron's innovation in graphic techniques laid the foundation for his creation of the Led Zeppelin III album cover in 1970. This album cover is a small component of a vast and varied body of work spanning five decades, with much of his work having a close association to rock and roll. He also designed the sleeve for Fancy's 1975 album Something To Remember.

Zacron has been described as "multi-sided and multi-talented" with "a robust ethos of independence and bravery, a lifelong quest for knowledge". He was a public advocate of artistic freedom and a notable financial contributor to the Great Ormond Street Hospital in London for terminally ill children, organised by Light and Sound at Abbey Road Studios.

Zacron died in January 2012 from bowel cancer, but his death was not revealed publicly until August that year.

References

1943 births
2012 deaths
20th-century English male artists
21st-century English male artists
Alumni of Kingston University
Academics of Leeds Arts University
Deaths from colorectal cancer
Led Zeppelin
People from the London Borough of Sutton
Pseudonymous artists